Marcel Pagnol (1895 – 1974) was a French writer.

Pagnol may also refer to:
Lycée Français International Marcel Pagnol, French international school in Asunción, Paraguay
Jacqueline Pagnol (née Bouvier, 1926), French actress and second wife of Marcel Pagnol
 The asteroid 10306 Pagnol